Obbia Airport  is an airstrip serving Hobyo, Somalia.
Its single runway has a non-hardened surface and lies parallel to the coastline, about 2 km inland. It has a length of 1100 m according to the Great Circle Mapper but some 1800 m when measured on satellite imagery.
There are no fuel storage facilities.
There are no scheduled flights to Hobyo.
In August 2019 it was announced that Qatar plans to build a new airport in Hobyo, but the concrete intentions are not clear yet.

See also
List of airports in Somalia

References

External links

Airports in Somalia
Galmudug